The Cabinet Committee on Political Affairs of the Central Government of India deals with problems related to Centre-State relations, considers economic and political issues that require a broader perspective, and handles foreign affairs that do not have internal or external security implications. It is also known as 'super cabinet,' as it consists of most of the most important Cabinet ministers.

The Cabinet Committee on Political Affairs—like all other Cabinet Committees of the Government of India—is extra-constitutional. It is chaired by the Prime Minister of India, Narendra Modi, and was reconstituted by him according to the Government of India (Transaction of Business) Rules, 1961 shortly after his party's victory in the 2019 general election.

Members
The Prime Minister of India can select and dismiss members of Cabinet Committees as he sees fit. As of June 2019, the committee consists of the following members:

Narendra Modi, Prime Minister
Rajnath Singh, Minister of Defence
Amit Shah, Minister of Home Affairs
Nitin Gadkari, Minister for Road Transport & Highways, Minister of Shipping, and Minister of Micro, Small and Medium Enterprises
Nirmala Sitharaman, Minister of Finance and Corporate Affairs
Narendra Singh Tomar, Minister of Agriculture & Farmers Welfare and Minister of Rural Development
Ravi Shankar Prasad, Minister of Law and Justice, Minister of Electronics and Information Technology, and Minister of Communications
Dr. Harsh Vardhan, Minister of Science and Technology, Minister of Health and Family Welfare, and Minister of Earth Sciences
Piyush Goyal, Minister of Railways and Minister of Commerce and Industry
Pralhad Joshi, Minister of Parliamentary Affairs, Minister of Coal, and Minister of Mines 
Sarbananda Sonowal, Minister of Ports, Shipping and Waterways, Minister of AYUSH

See also

Appointments Committee of the Cabinet
Cabinet Committee on Security
Union Council of Ministers of India
Cabinet Secretariat (India)
Union Government ministries of India

References

External links
Government of India (Transaction of Business) Rules, 1961 (PDF), Cabinet Secretariat of the Government of India, official website

Government of India
Cabinet Secretariat of India